This was the first edition of the tournament.

Marco Cecchinato won the title after defeating Yannick Hanfmann 4–6, 6–4, 6–3 in the final.

Seeds

Draw

Finals

Top half

Bottom half

References

External links
Main draw
Qualifying draw

Challenger Rio de Janeiro - 1